Karian or Kariyan or Kareyan or Karyan or Karayan may refer to:
 Karyan, Fars
 Karian, Hormozgan
 Karyan, Kermanshah
 Karian, alternate name of Sarab-e Karian
 Karyan, Markazi
 Karian Rural District, in Hormozgan Province